Asri Akbar (born 29 January 1984) is an Indonesian professional footballer who plays as a central midfielder for Liga 2 club Persekat Tegal.

Club career
On August 26, 2012, he signed with Persib Bandung. On October 26, 2013, he moved to Sriwijaya FC. Despite interest from other teams, he extended his contract and will play for Sriwijaya FC in the 2015 Indonesia Super League.

Honours

Club

Persija Jakarta
 Liga 1: 2018
 Indonesia President's Cup: 2018
Persita Tangerang
 Liga 2 runner-up: 2019
RANS Cilegon
 Liga 2 runner-up: 2021

References

External links
 
 Asri Akbar at Liga Indonesia

1984 births
Bugis people
Indonesian Muslims
Association football midfielders
Living people
Sportspeople from South Sulawesi
People from Gowa Regency
Indonesian footballers
Persim Maros players
Semen Padang F.C. players
PSMS Medan players
PSM Makassar players
Persiba Balikpapan players
Persib Bandung players
Sriwijaya F.C. players
Mitra Kukar players
Borneo F.C. players
Persija Jakarta players
Persita Tangerang players
Persijap Jepara players
RANS Nusantara F.C. players
Liga 1 (Indonesia) players
Liga 2 (Indonesia) players